Reborn is the fourth volume in a series of six novels known as The Adversary Cycle written by American author F. Paul Wilson. It was first published in March 1990 by Dark Harvest.

In 2009, a revised edition was published.

Plot summary

Almost immediately after being slain by Glaeken (Trismaegistus) in a castle keep in Romania in the Spring of 1941, Rasalom has opportunistically entered the body of a clone that grows within a woman hired by the scientist in charge of a project seeking to create a genetically enhanced super-soldier for the U.S. Army.

The story actually begins in 1968 when Jim Stevens, an apparently normal man, finds that he is heir to the fortune of a recently deceased brilliant scientist by the name of Doctor Hanley. This amazing windfall promises not only financial independence but the solution to the mystery of his life.  Lovingly raised by adoptive parents, Stevens yearns to discover who his parents were.  Named in Hanley's will, Jim is sure that the scientist is his father.  Moving into Hanley's mansion, Stevens finds the scientist's confidential journals. They reveal that he is, in fact, a clone of the late Doctor Hanley.

When word of Jim's origins gets out, Stevens finds himself the target of "The Chosen", a group of religious fanatics convinced of the imminent arrival of The Antichrist. The formerly immortal man called Glaeken is now an aging mortal named Veillure. He contacts the group and confirms that some kind of unimaginably horrific being is about to enter the world.

During a confrontation with The Chosen, Jim's reckless behavior leads to his gruesome death, ironically, in a freak accident. His wife Carol, however, soon learns that she is pregnant, and the unborn fetus already begins proving itself to be a vessel for evil. Carol's protector is Jim's father Jonah, who, unknown to her, is a lifelong sociopath and an opportunistically homicidal psychopath as well. Jonah stops at nothing to ensure the baby's survival and guarantees that it will have more than a fighting chance to take over the Earth after attaining early adulthood.

Glaeken is content to take a back seat to all of this as he feels he has earned his permanent retirement from the battle between the forces of Darkness and Light. He realizes that a major confrontation is inevitable but placidly aspires to count himself and his wife Magda among the dearly departed before that dark day descends with a deafening thud upon humanity's collective cranium.

1990 American novels
American thriller novels
American horror novels
Fiction set in 1941